Wajid Khan may refer to:

 Wajid Khan, Baron Khan of Burnley (born 1979), British Labour Party politician and MEP
 Wajid Khan (Canadian politician) (born 1946), Conservative Party politician and businessman
 Wajid Khan (composer) (1977–2020), part of the Sajid–Wajid musical duo
 Wajid Ullah Khan, Pakistani politician

See also

Wahid Khan